Afonso Motta (born 8 January 1950) is a Brazilian politician. He has served as a member of the Chamber of Deputies of Brazil since 2011.

Born in Porto Alegre. Motta attended at the Federal University of Rio Grande do Sul, where he earned his Bachelor of Legal Sciences degree in 1972. He worked as a lawyer. In 2011, Motta became a member of the Chamber of Deputies of Brazil since 2011. In March 2021, he served as the chairperson of the Committee of Labor, Administration and Public Service.

References 

1950 births
Living people
People from Porto Alegre
Brazilian lawyers
Members of the Chamber of Deputies (Brazil) from Rio Grande do Sul
Democratic Labour Party (Brazil) politicians
Federal University of Rio Grande do Sul alumni
21st-century Brazilian politicians